Tavares (also known as The Tavares Brothers) is an American R&B, funk and soul music group composed of five Cape Verdean-American brothers. Some were born in New Bedford, Massachusetts, and Providence, Rhode Island, and they would move back and forth between the two cities throughout their childhood.  They are probably best known for their 1976 hit "Heaven Must Be Missing an Angel".

History
The brothers, whose parents were of Cape Verdean descent, started performing in 1959 as Chubby and the Turnpikes when the youngest brother was nine years old. P-Funk keyboardist/architect Bernie Worrell briefly joined the group in 1968, while attending the New England Conservatory of Music. Future Aerosmith drummer Joey Kramer appeared as the drummer with the group in a later incarnation called The Turnpikes from the fall of 1969 until September 1970, when he was invited to join Steven Tyler's band. He was later replaced with drummer Paul Klodner and bassist Steve Strout, which gave them a tight, punchy rhythm section. Chubby and The Turnpikes signed with Capitol Records in 1967 and had a couple of local hit records including "I Know the Inside Story" in 1967 and "Nothing But Promises" in 1968. 

By 1973, they had changed their name to Tavares and scored their first R&B top 10 (Pop top 40) hit with "Check It Out", and soon began charting regularly on the R&B and pop charts. Their first album included their brother Victor, who sang lead on "Check It Out", but dropped out of the group shortly afterward. In 1974, Tavares had a No. 1 R&B hit with Hall & Oates's "She's Gone", (which became a hit for Hall & Oates as well two years later).

Nineteen seventy-five turned out to be their most successful year chartwise, with a Top 40 Pop album (In the City), the No. 25 hit "Remember What I Told You to Forget", and their biggest hit, the Top 10 Pop/No. 1 R&B smash "It Only Takes a Minute", which was later successfully covered by both Jonathan King and Take That, and sampled by Jennifer Lopez. They parlayed this success into a spot as an opening act for The Jackson 5. KC and The Sunshine Band was also on this tour. "Minute" was followed by a string of hits: "Heaven Must Be Missing an Angel", "Don't Take Away the Music" (both 1976), and "Whodunit" (1977, another No. 1 R&B hit). In 1977 they also recorded "I Wanna See You Soon", a duet with Capitol labelmate Freda Payne, which received airplay on BBC Radio 1 but failed to chart.

Many of their hits, however, underplayed their R&B background and gave the group the image of being a disco act. This perception was reinforced by their appearance on the soundtrack to the film Saturday Night Fever in 1977. Tavares recorded the Bee Gees song "More Than a Woman", and their version reached the Pop Top 40 that year. The soundtrack became one of the most successful in history, giving Tavares their only Grammy Award.

Later albums, such as Madam Butterfly and Supercharged, strayed from the disco format and were less successful on the pop chart (although they continued to have Top 10 R&B hits such as "Never Had a Love Like This Before", and the popular sociopolitical "Bad Times", written by British singer-songwriter Gerard McMahon). At the start of the 1980s, Tavares left Capitol Records, signing with RCA. They had one last major hit, the ballad "A Penny for Your Thoughts", for which they were nominated for a Grammy in 1982; their last major release was Words and Music in 1983.

In 1984, Ralph stepped down from the group. Pooch took over as the non-commissioned business/booking agent for Tavares from 1984 to 2014. Tiny left in the mid-1990s to pursue his solo career, while the other three brothers continued to tour. Tiny rejoined the group in 2009. Musician Feliciano "Flash" Vierra Tavares, the family patriarch and father of all members of Tavares, died in 2008. 

Chubby Tavares released his first solo album, Jealousy, on July 17, 2012, a few months after Tavares, the Four Tops (who recorded the original version of "Remember What I Told You to Forget"), and The Temptations toured the UK together. Preceding the album, a digital-only single was released called "It's Christmas". On December 17, it reached No. 5 on Amazon's Acid Jazz chart. Both the album and the single were produced by Carla Olson, and the album was released by "Fuel Records"/Universal Records.

In 2013, the brothers were honored with "Lifetime Achievement Awards" by The National R&B Music Society Black Tie Gala, in Atlantic City, New Jersey. All six brothers attended and performed on stage together for the first time in 37 years. 

In 2014, Pooch suffered a stroke and the business/booking for Tavares was turned over to Oriola Mngmt LLC. He has regained his health and opted for retirement. 

They were inducted into the Rhode Island Music Hall of Fame in 2014.

Ralph Tavares died on December 8, 2021, two days before his 80th birthday.

Band members
 Ralph – Ralph Edward Vierra Tavares (December 10, 1941 – December 8, 2021)
 Pooch – Arthur Paul Tavares (b. November 12, 1942)
 Chubby – Antone Lee Tavares (b. June 2, 1944)
 Butch – Feliciano Vierra Tavares Jr. (b. May 18, 1948)
 Tiny – Perry Lee Tavares (b. October 23, 1949)

Discography

Studio albums

Compilation albums

Singles

Awards
The Grammy Awards are awarded annually by the National Academy of Recording Arts and Sciences of the United States for outstanding achievements in the music industry. Often considered the highest music honor, the awards were established in 1958. Tavares has won one award from one nomination.

Inducted into the Cape Verdean Museum Hall of Fame (2006).

Lifetime Achievement Award by The National R&B Music Society (2013)

Inducted into the Rhode Island Music Hall of Fame in 2014.

See also
List of number-one dance hits (United States)
List of artists who reached number one on the US Dance chart

References

External links
 
 
 
 Taveres at Soul Tracks
 Tavares at Soul Walking
 Tavares at Rhode Island Music Hall of Fame Historical Archive

American soul musical groups
Vocal quintets
American disco groups
Musical groups from Massachusetts
American funk musical groups
American dance music groups
Grammy Award winners
American musicians of Cape Verdean descent
Musical groups established in 1959
Family musical groups
Capitol Records artists
Musical groups from Rhode Island
1959 establishments in the United States